Sand Prairie Township is located in Tazewell County, Illinois. As of the 2010 census, its population was 1,441 and it contained 582 housing units. Sand Prairie Township changed its name from Jefferson Township May 20, 1850.

Geography

Demographics

References

External links
City-data.com
Illinois State Archives

Townships in Tazewell County, Illinois
Peoria metropolitan area, Illinois
Townships in Illinois